Carnegie Institute may refer to:

Carnegie Institute, operator of the Carnegie Museums of Pittsburgh, Pittsburgh, Pennsylvania
Carnegie Institution for Science, formally known as the Carnegie Institution of Washington, Washington, D.C.
Carnegie Institute of Technology, predecessor to Carnegie Mellon University in Pittsburgh, Pennsylvania